Ippodromo della Favorita (English: La Favorita Hippodrome) is a horse racing venue in Palermo, Sicily, Italy built in 1953. It is located next to the Stadio Renzo Barbera in the southernmost part of Parco della Favorita, Palermo's largest urban park.

Access to the venue is free of charge, it has a maximum audience capacity of 15,000, of which 2,500 places are seated. Adjacent to the hippodrome, various facilities can be found, such as 2 parking areas for visitors, a playground for children, as well as various restaurants.

The hippodrome is divided in two areas: the actual racing track is 1,000 metres long and 25 metres wide, 
while the exercise track is located within the actual racing track and is 800 metres long.

The stables sector has 400 placements for horses, as well as staff accommodation, a veterinary station, additional car parking and food stalls.

Sports venues in Palermo
Horse racing venues in Italy